

Events

Pre-1600
474 BC – Roman consul Aulus Manlius Vulso celebrates an ovation for concluding the war against Veii and securing a forty years truce. 
44 BC – The assassination of Julius Caesar takes place on the Ides of March.
 493 – Odoacer, the first barbarian King of Italy after the fall of the Western Roman Empire, is slain by Theoderic the Great, king of the Ostrogoths, while the two kings were feasting together.
 856 – Michael III, emperor of the Byzantine Empire, overthrows the regency of his mother, empress Theodora (wife of Theophilos) with support of the Byzantine nobility.
 897 –  Al-Hadi ila'l-Haqq Yahya enters Sa'dah and founds the Zaydi Imamate of Yemen.
 933 – After a ten-year truce, German King Henry the Fowler defeats a Hungarian army at the Battle of Riade near the Unstrut river.
1311 – Battle of Halmyros: The Catalan Company defeats Walter V, Count of Brienne to take control of the Duchy of Athens, a Crusader state in Greece.
1564 – Mughal Emperor Akbar abolishes the jizya tax on non-Muslim subjects.

1601–1900
1672 – King Charles II of England issues the Royal Declaration of Indulgence, granting limited religious freedom to all Christians.
1783 – In an emotional speech in Newburgh, New York, George Washington asks his officers not to support the Newburgh Conspiracy. The plea is successful, and the threatened coup d'état never takes place.
1820 – Maine is admitted as the twenty-third U.S. state.
1823 – Sailor Benjamin Morrell erroneously reported the existence of the island of New South Greenland near Antarctica.
1848 – A revolution breaks out in Hungary, and the Habsburg rulers are compelled to meet the demands of the reform party.
1874 – France and Vietnam sign the Second Treaty of Saigon, further recognizing the full sovereignty of France over Cochinchina.
1875 – Archbishop of New York John McCloskey is named the first cardinal in the United States.
1877 – First ever official cricket test match is played: Australia vs England at the MCG Stadium, in Melbourne, Australia.
1888 – Start of the Anglo-Tibetan War of 1888.

1901–present
1907 – The first parliamentary elections of Finland (at the time the Grand Duchy of Finland) are held.
1917 – Tsar Nicholas II of Russia abdicates the Russian throne, ending the 304-year Romanov dynasty.
1918 – Finnish Civil War: The battle of Tampere begins.
1919 – Ukrainian War of Independence: The Kontrrazvedka is established as the counterintelligence division of the Revolutionary Insurgent Army of Ukraine.
1921 – Talaat Pasha, former Grand Vizir of the Ottoman Empire and chief architect of the Armenian genocide is assassinated in Berlin by a 23-year-old Armenian, Soghomon Tehlirian.
1922 – After Egypt gains nominal independence from the United Kingdom, Fuad I becomes King of Egypt.
1927 – The first Women's Boat Race between the University of Oxford and the University of Cambridge takes place on The Isis in Oxford.
1939 – Germany occupies Czechoslovakia.
  1939   – Carpatho-Ukraine declares itself an independent republic, but is annexed by Hungary the next day.
1943 – World War II: Third Battle of Kharkiv: The Germans retake the city of Kharkiv from the Soviet armies.
1951 – Iranian oil industry is nationalized.
1961 – At the 1961 Commonwealth Prime Ministers' Conference, South Africa announces that it will withdraw from the Commonwealth when the South African Constitution of 1961 comes into effect.
1965 – President Lyndon B. Johnson, responding to the Selma crisis, tells U.S. Congress "We shall overcome" while advocating the Voting Rights Act.
1974 – Fifteen people are killed when Sterling Airways Flight 901, a Sud Aviation Caravelle, catches fire following a landing gear collapse at Mehrabad International Airport in Tehran, Iran.
1978 – Somalia and Ethiopia signed a truce to end the Ethio-Somali War.
1986 – Collapse of Hotel New World: Thirty-three people die when the Hotel New World in Singapore collapses.
1990 – Mikhail Gorbachev is elected as the first President of the Soviet Union.
1991 – Cold War: The Treaty on the Final Settlement with Respect to Germany comes into effect, granting full sovereignty to the Federal Republic of Germany.
2008 – Stockpiles of obsolete ammunition explode at an ex-military ammunition depot in the village of Gërdec, Albania, killing 26 people.
2011 – Beginning of the Syrian Civil War.
2019 – Fifty-one people are killed in the Christchurch mosque shootings.
  2019   – Beginning of the 2019–20 Hong Kong protests.
  2019   – Approximately 1.4 million young people in 123 countries go on strike to protest climate change.

2022 – The 2022 Sri Lankan protests begins amidst Sri Lanka's economic collapse.

Births

Pre-1600
1493 – Anne de Montmorency, French captain and diplomat (d. 1567)
1516 – Alqas Mirza, Safavid prince (d. 1550)
1582 – Daniel Featley, English theologian and controversialist (d. 1645)
1591 – Alexandre de Rhodes, French missionary (d. 1660)

1601–1900
1638 – Shunzhi Emperor of China (d. 1661)
1666 – George Bähr, German architect, designed the Dresden Frauenkirche (d. 1738)
1754 – Archibald Menzies, Scottish surgeon and botanist (d. 1842)
1767 – Andrew Jackson, American general, judge, and politician, 7th President of the United States (d. 1845)
1779 – William Lamb, 2nd Viscount Melbourne, English politician, Prime Minister of the United Kingdom (d. 1848)
1790 – Ludwig Immanuel Magnus, German mathematician and academic (d. 1861)
1791 – Charles Knight, English author and publisher (d. 1873)
1809 – Joseph Jenkins Roberts, American-Liberian historian and politician, 1st President of Liberia (d. 1876)
1813 – John Snow, English physician and epidemiologist (d. 1858)
1821 – Johann Josef Loschmidt, Austrian physicist and chemist (d. 1895)
  1821   – William Milligan, Scottish theologian and author (d. 1892)
1824 – Jules Chevalier, French priest, founded the Missionaries of the Sacred Heart (d. 1907)
1830 – Paul Heyse, German author, poet, and playwright, Nobel Prize laureate (d. 1914)
  1830   – Élisée Reclus, French geographer and anarchist (d. 1905)
1831 – Saint Daniele Comboni, Italian missionary and saint (d. 1881)
1835 – Eduard Strauss, Austrian composer and conductor (d. 1916)
1838 – Karl Davydov, Russian cellist, composer, and conductor (d. 1889)
1851 – John Sebastian Little, American lawyer and politician, Governor of Arkansas (d. 1916)
  1851   – William Mitchell Ramsay, Scottish archaeologist and scholar (d. 1939)
1852 – Augusta, Lady Gregory, Anglo-Irish landowner, playwright, and translator (d. 1932)
1854 – Emil von Behring, German physiologist and physician, Nobel Prize laureate (d. 1917)
1857 – Christian Michelsen, Norwegian businessman and politician, 1st Prime Minister of Norway (d. 1925)
1858 – Liberty Hyde Bailey, American botanist and academic, co-founded the American Society for Horticultural Science (d. 1954)
1866 – Matthew Charlton, Australian miner and politician (d. 1948)
1868 – Grace Chisholm Young, English mathematician (d. 1944)
1869 – Stanisław Wojciechowski, Polish scholar and politician, President of the Republic of Poland (d. 1953)
1874 – Harold L. Ickes, American journalist and politician, United States Secretary of the Interior (d. 1952)
1878 – Reza Shah, Iranian Shah (d. 1944)
1879 – Benjamin R. Jacobs, American biochemist (d. 1963)
1886 – Gerda Wegener, Danish artist (d. 1940)
1897 – Jackson Scholz, American runner (d. 1986)
1900 – Gilberto Freyre, Brazilian sociologist, anthropologist, historian and writer (d. 1987)

1901–present
1904 – George Brent, Irish-American actor (d. 1979)
  1904   – J. Pat O'Malley, English-American actor (d. 1985)
1905 – Berthold Schenk Graf von Stauffenberg, German lawyer and judge (d. 1944)
1907 – Zarah Leander, Swedish actress and singer (d. 1981)
1912 – Lightnin' Hopkins, American blues singer-songwriter and guitarist (d. 1982)
  1912   – Louis Paul Boon, Flemish journalist and author (d. 1979)
1913 – Macdonald Carey, American actor (d. 1994)
  1913   – Jack Fairman, English race car driver (d. 2002)
1916 – Frank Coghlan, Jr., American actor and pilot (d. 2009)
  1916   – Fadil Hoxha, Kosovar commander and politician, President of Kosovo (d. 2001)
  1916   – Harry James, American trumpet player, bandleader, and actor (d. 1983)
1918 – Richard Ellmann, American author and critic (d. 1987)
  1918   – Punch Imlach, Canadian ice hockey player, coach, and manager (d. 1987)
1919 – Lawrence Tierney, American actor (d. 2002)
1920 – E. Donnall Thomas, American physician and academic, Nobel Prize laureate (d. 2012)
1921 – Madelyn Pugh, American television writer and producer (d. 2011)
1926 – Ben Johnston, American composer and academic  (d. 2019)
  1926   – Norm Van Brocklin, American football player and coach (d. 1983)
1927 – Christian Marquand, French actor, director, and screenwriter (d. 2000)
  1927   – Carl Smith, American singer-songwriter and guitarist (d. 2010)
1928 – Bob Wilber, American clarinetist and saxophonist (d. 2019)
1930 – Zhores Alferov, Belarusian-Russian physicist and academic, Nobel Prize laureate (d. 2019)
1932 – Alan Bean, American astronaut and pilot (d. 2018)
  1932   – Arif Mardin, Turkish-American record producer (d. 2006)
1933 – Ruth Bader Ginsburg, American lawyer and judge (d. 2020)
  1933   – Philippe de Broca, French actor, director, and screenwriter (d. 2004)
1934 – Kanshi Ram, Indian politician (d. 2006)
1935 – Judd Hirsch, American actor
  1935   – Jimmy Swaggart, American pastor and television host
1936 – Howard Greenfield, American songwriter (d. 1986)
1937 – Valentin Rasputin, Russian environmentalist and author (d. 2015)
1939 – Ted Kaufman, American politician
  1939   – Robert Nye, English author, poet, and playwright (d. 2016)
  1939   – Julie Tullis, English mountaineer (d. 1986)
1940 – Frank Dobson, English politician, Secretary of State for Health (d. 2019)
  1940   – Phil Lesh, American bassist
1941 – Mike Love, American singer-songwriter and musician
  1941   – Carolyn Hansson, Canadian materials engineer 
1943 – David Cronenberg, Canadian actor, director, and screenwriter
  1943   – Lynda La Plante, English actress, screenwriter, and author
  1943   – Michael Scott-Joynt, English bishop (d. 2014)
  1943   – The Iron Sheik, Iranian-American wrestler and actor
  1943   – Sly Stone, American musician and record producer
1944 – Chi Cheng, Taiwanese runner
  1944   – Jacques Doillon, French director and screenwriter
  1944   – Francis Mankiewicz, Canadian director, producer, and screenwriter (d. 1993)
1946 – Bobby Bonds, American baseball player and coach (d. 2003)
  1946   – John Dempsey, English born Irish international footballer and manager
1947 – Ry Cooder, American singer-songwriter and guitarist
1948 – Kate Bornstein, American author and activist
  1948   – Sérgio Vieira de Mello, Brazilian diplomat (d. 2003)
1951 – David Alton, Baron Alton of Liverpool, English politician
1954 – Isobel Buchanan, Scottish soprano and actress
  1954   – Henry Marsh, American runner and businessman
  1954   – Craig Wasson, American actor
1955 – Mohsin Khan, Pakistani cricketer
  1955   – Dee Snider, American singer-songwriter
1959 – Harold Baines, American baseball player
  1959   – Renny Harlin, Finnish director and producer
  1959   – Ben Okri, Nigerian poet and author
  1959   – Eliot Teltscher, American tennis player
1960 – Mike Pagliarulo, American baseball player
1961 – Terry Cummings, American basketball player
1963 – Bret Michaels, American musician
1964 – Rockwell, American singer-songwriter and musician
1965 – Sunetra Gupta, Indian epidemiologist, author, and academic
1967 &dash; Naoko Takeuchi, Japanese manga artist and creator of Sailor Moon
1968 – Kahimi Karie, Japanese singer
  1968   – Mark McGrath, American singer-songwriter
  1968   – Sabrina Salerno, Italian singer-songwriter
1969 – Gianluca Festa, Italian footballer
  1969   – Yutaka Take, Japanese jockey
1970 – Derek Parra, American speed skater
1971 – Joanne Wise, English long jumper
1972 – Mark Hoppus, American musician
  1972   – Holger Stromberg, German chef
  1972   – Mike Tomlin, American football player and coach
1974 – Robert Fick, American baseball player
1975 – Eva Longoria, American actress
  1975   – Darcy Tucker, Canadian ice hockey player
  1975   – will.i.am, American rapper, producer, and actor
1976 – Cara Pifko, Canadian actress
1977 – Major Sandeep Unnikrishnan, AC, Indian military officer
1979 – Kyle Mills, New Zealand cricketer
  1979   – Kevin Youkilis, American baseball player
1980 – Freddie Bynum, American baseball player
1981 – Young Buck, American rapper
  1981   – Mikael Forssell, German-Finnish footballer
  1981   – Jens Salumäe, Estonian skier
1982 – Wilson Kipsang Kiprotich, Kenyan runner
1983 – Umut Bulut, Turkish footballer
  1983   – Ben Hilfenhaus, Australian cricketer
  1983   – Kostas Kaimakoglou, Greek basketball player
  1983   – Golda Marcus, Salvadoran swimmer
  1983   – Daryl Murphy, Irish footballer
1984 – Badradine Belloumou, French-Algerian footballer
  1984   – Olivier Jean, Canadian speed skater
  1984   – Kostas Vasileiadis, Greek basketball player
1986 – Jai Courtney, Australian actor
1988 – Lil Dicky, American rapper, comedian, and actor
  1988   – Éver Guzmán, Mexican footballer
  1988   – James Reimer, Canadian ice hockey player
1989 – Sam Baldock, English footballer
  1989   – Sandro, Brazilian international footballer
  1989   – Gil Roberts, American sprinter
  1989   – Adrien Silva, Portuguese footballer
1991 – Kurt Baptiste, Australian rugby league player
  1991   – Xavier Henry, American basketball player
1993 – Alia Bhatt, British actress
  1993   – Aleksandra Krunić, Serbian tennis player
  1993   – Paul Pogba, French footballer
1996 – Maxwell Jacob Friedman, American professional wrestler
  1996   – Seonaid McIntosh, Scottish sports shooter
2000 – Kristian Kostov, Russian-Bulgarian singer-songwriter

Deaths

Pre-1600
44 BC – Julius Caesar, Roman general and statesman (b. 100 BC)
 220 – Cao Cao, Chinese general, warlord and statesman
 493 – Odoacer, first king of Italy after the fall of the Western Roman Empire (b. 433)
 963 – Romanos II, Byzantine emperor
 990 – Siegfried I (the Older), German nobleman
1124 – Ernulf, Bishop of Rochester
1190 – Isabella of Hainault, queen of Philip II of France (b. 1170)
1311 – Walter V, Count of Brienne
1536 – Pargalı Ibrahim Pasha, Ottoman politician, Grand Vizier of the Ottoman Empire (b. 1493)
1575 – Annibale Padovano, Italian organist and composer (b. 1527)

1601–1900
1673 – Salvator Rosa, Italian painter and poet (b. 1615)
1711 – Eusebio Kino, Italian priest and missionary (b. 1645)
1820 – Clement Mary Hofbauer, Austrian priest and saint (b. 1751)
1842 – Luigi Cherubini, Italian composer and theorist (b. 1760)
1848 – Johan Jakob Nervander, Finnish poet, physicist and meteorologist (b. 1805)
1891 – Joseph Bazalgette, English engineer and academic (b. 1819)
1897 – James Joseph Sylvester, English mathematician and academic (b. 1814)
1898 – Henry Bessemer, English engineer and businessman (b. 1813)

1901–present
1921 – Talaat Pasha, Ottoman politician, Grand Vizier of the Ottoman Empire (b. 1874)
1927 – Hector Rason, English-Australian politician, 7th Premier of Western Australia (b. 1858)
1937 – H. P. Lovecraft, American short story writer, editor, and novelist (b. 1890)
1941 – Alexej von Jawlensky, Russian-German painter (b. 1864)
1942 – Rachel Field, American author and poet (b. 1894)
1948 – Imanuel Lauster, German engineer (b. 1873)
1959 – Lester Young, American saxophonist and clarinet player (b. 1909)
1962 – Arthur Compton, American physicist and academic, Nobel Prize laureate (b. 1892)
1966 – Abe Saperstein, American basketball player and coach (b. 1902)
1969 – Miles Malleson, English actor and screenwriter (b. 1888)
1970 – Tarjei Vesaas, Norwegian author and poet (b. 1897)
1975 – Aristotle Onassis, Greek-Argentinian businessman (b. 1906)
1977 – Hubert Aquin, Canadian author and activist (b. 1929)
  1977   – Antonino Rocca, Italian-American wrestler and referee (b. 1921)
1981 – René Clair, French director and screenwriter (b. 1898)
1983 – Rebecca West, English author and critic (b. 1892)
1988 – Dmitri Polyakov, Ukrainian general and spy (b. 1921)
1990 – Farzad Bazoft, Iranian-English journalist (b. 1958)
  1990   – Tom Harmon, American football player and sportscaster (b. 1919)
1991 – Bud Freeman, American saxophonist, composer, and bandleader (b. 1906)
1997 – Gail Davis, American actress (b. 1925)
  1997   – Victor Vasarely, Hungarian-French painter (b. 1906)
1998 – Benjamin Spock, American pediatrician and author (b. 1903)
2001 – Ann Sothern, American actress and singer (b. 1909)
2003 – Thora Hird, English actress (b. 1911)
  2003   – Paul Stojanovich, American television producer, created World's Wildest Police Videos (b. 1955)
2004 – Philippe Lemaire, French actor (b. 1927)
  2004   – Bill Pickering, New Zealand-American scientist and engineer (b. 1910)
  2004   – John Pople, English-American chemist and academic, Nobel Prize laureate (b. 1925)
2005 – Otar Korkia, Georgian basketball player (b. 1923)
2006 – Georgios Rallis, Greek lieutenant and politician, Prime Minister of Greece (b. 1918)
  2006   – Red Storey, Canadian football player and referee (b. 1918)
2007 – Charles Harrelson, American murderer (b. 1938)
  2007   – Stuart Rosenberg, American director and producer (b. 1927)
2008 – Mikey Dread, Jamaican singer-songwriter and producer (b. 1954)
  2008   – G. David Low, American astronaut and engineer (b. 1956)
  2008   – Sarla Thakral, First Indian woman to earn a pilot's license. (b. 1914)
2009 – Ron Silver, American actor, director, and producer (b. 1946)
2010 – Kazim al-Samawi, Iraqi poet (b. 1925)
2011 – Nate Dogg, American rapper (b. 1969)
  2011   – Smiley Culture, English singer and DJ (b. 1963)
2012 – Mervyn Davies, Welsh rugby player (b. 1946)
  2012   – Dave Philley, American baseball player and manager (b. 1920)
2013 – Booth Gardner, American businessman and politician, Governor of Washington (b. 1936)
  2013   – Terry Lightfoot, English clarinet player (b. 1935)
  2013   – Leverne McDonnell, Australian actress (b. 1963)
  2013   – Peter Worsley, English sociologist (b. 1924)
2014 – Scott Asheton, American drummer (b. 1949)
  2014   – David Brenner, American comedian, actor, and author (b. 1936)
  2014   – Bo Callaway, American soldier and politician, United States Secretary of the Army (b. 1927)
  2014   – Clarissa Dickson Wright, English chef, author, and television personality (b. 1947)
2015 – Collins Chabane, South African politician (b. 1960)
  2015   – Robert Clatworthy, English sculptor and educator (b. 1928)
  2015   – Sally Forrest, American actress and dancer (b. 1928)
  2015   – Curtis Gans, American political scientist and author (b. 1937)
  2015   – Mike Porcaro, American bass player (b. 1955)
2016 – Sylvia Anderson, English voice actress and television and film producer (b. 1927)
  2016   – Asa Briggs, English historian and academic (b. 1921)
  2016   – Seru Rabeni, Fijian rugby player (b. 1978)
2019 – Larry DiTillio, American film and TV series writer (b. 1948)
2020 – Vittorio Gregotti, Italian architect (b. 1927)
2022 – Barbara Maier Gustern, American vocal coach and singer (b. 1935)

Holidays and observances
Ancient Roman religious observance:
Ides of March
Christian feast day:
Aristobulus of Britannia (Roman Catholic Church)
Clement Mary Hofbauer
Leocritia
Saint Longinus
Louise de Marillac
March 15 (Eastern Orthodox liturgics)
Constitution Day (Belarus)
International Day To Combat Islamophobia
Joseph Jenkins Roberts' Birthday (Liberia)
National Day, celebrating the Hungarian Revolution of 1848 (Hungary)
World Consumer Rights Day (International)
Youth Day (Palau)

Notes

References

External links

 BBC: On This Day
 
 Historical Events on March 15

Days of the year
March